The Mount Hua Sect, also known as the Huashan Sect, is a fictional martial arts sect mentioned in several works of wuxia fiction. It is commonly featured as one of the leading orthodox sects in the wulin (martial artists' community). It is named after the place where it is based, Mount Hua. The sect appears in three of Jin Yong's novels.

There is a real-life Mount Hua Sect which has hardly any association with martial arts. It was founded in the Song dynasty by Hao Datong, one of the "Seven Immortals of Quanzhen", who also appears as a character in Jin Yong's Condor Trilogy. However, in wuxia fiction, these two sects do have any connection.

History
In The Heaven Sword and Dragon Saber, set in the Yuan dynasty, the Mount Hua Sect is briefly mentioned to be one of the six leading orthodox sects in the jianghu. Its leader is Xianyu Tong.

In The Smiling, Proud Wanderer, the sect's leader Yue Buqun is the sect's 13th-generation leader. The Mount Hua Sect is part of the Five Mountain Sword Sects Alliance and Yue Buqun becomes the alliance's chief after defeating his predecessor, Zuo Lengchan of the Mount Song Sect. The novel's protagonist, Linghu Chong, is Yue Buqun's first apprentice. In the novel, the Mount Hua Sect is inferior to only the Shaolin Sect, Wudang Sect and Sun Moon Holy Cult.

In Sword Stained with Royal Blood, set near the end of the Ming dynasty, the protagonist, Yuan Chengzhi, is a member of the Mount Hua Sect. His master, Mu Renqing, is the sect's leader and is reputed to be the best living swordsman in the jianghu (martial artists' community) at the time. The Mount Hua Sect is one of the Four Great Sword Sects alongside Emei, Kunlun and Diancang.

Skills and martial arts
In The Smiling, Proud Wanderer, the martial arts of the Mount Hua Sect mainly comprise swordplay techniques and inner energy cultivation skills. The sect is split into the Sword and Qi factions, which focus on swordplay techniques and inner energy cultivation respectively. The division is caused by an internal conflict arising from a dispute over the Sunflower Manual by the founders of the factions. The Qi faction seized control of leadership of the sect and forced the Sword faction into exile. Since then, the Qi faction, headed by Yue Buqun, has been teaching the sect's members inner energy skills and other forms of martial arts while placing little focus on swordplay, for which the Mount Hua Sect is better known in the jianghu (martial artists' community).

Linghu Chong becomes famous after he learns the Nine Swords of Dugu from the Sword faction elder Feng Qingyang. Linghu Chong's generation sees the revival of the Sword faction. In Sword Stained with Royal Blood, Mu Renqing is highly revered in the jianghu for his outstanding swordplay techniques, as his nickname "Divine Sword Immortal Ape" suggests. Yuan Chengzhi inherits Mu Renqing's swordplay skills, while Mu Renqing's two other apprentices, Huang Zhen and Gui Xinshu, specialise in unarmed combat martial arts.

List of skills and martial arts
 Note: Although the skills listed here are entirely fictional, some may be based on or named after actual martial arts.

 Unarmed combat styles:
 Tiger Subduing Palm
 Primordial Chaos Palm
 Rock Splitting Fist
 Jade Smashing Fist
 Iron Finger
 Leopard's Tail Kicks
 Inner energy skills:
 Violet Mist Divine Skill
 Primordial Chaos Skill
 Hugging Energy Skill
 Mount Hua Steel Armour Breathing Skill
 Qinggong styles:
 Ten Rolls of Silk

 Armed combat styles:
 Mount Hua Swordplay
 Nineteen Styles of Jade Maiden Sword
 Wild Wind Swift Sword
 Reverse Dual Saber Style
 Gentleman Swordplay
 Virtuous Lady Swordplay
 Self-Cultivation Sword
 Mysterious Sword
 Life Taking Linked Three Immortals Sword
 Eagle and Serpent's Battle for Survival
 Mount Hua Three Deities Peak
 Nine Swords of Dugu

See also
Mount Hua

Notes

References

External links

Organizations in Wuxia fiction